Sunvära SK is a sports club in Sunvära, Sweden, established on 4 January 1943. The club runs bandy, and plays its home games on Sjöaremossen's artificial ice rink. The activity originally consisted of bandy, racewalking, skiing and track and field athletics. Since the 1950s the club only runs bandy.

The women's bandy team has played three seasons in the Swedish top division.

References

External links
Official website 

1943 establishments in Sweden
Athletics clubs in Sweden
Bandy clubs in Sweden
Ski clubs in Sweden
Sport in Halland County
Sports clubs established in 1943